Diana Rišková (born 22 October 1984) is a Slovak former competitive pair skater. With Vladimir Futáš, she competed at three World Junior Championships and won silver at the 2000 ISU Junior Grand Prix in the Czech Republic.

Career
Rišková began learning to skate in 1989. By the 1996–1997 season, she was competing as a pair skater with Vladimir Futáš. Representing Slovakia, the two placed 13th at the 1999 World Junior Championships in Zagreb, Croatia, and 12th at the 2000 World Junior Championships in Oberstdorf, Germany.

In the 2000–2001 season, Rišková/Futáš won silver medals at the ISU Junior Grand Prix in the Czech Republic, the Ondrej Nepela Memorial, and the Slovak Championships. The pair finished 15th at the 2001 World Junior Championships in Sofia, Bulgaria. They were coached by Vladimir Dvojnikov. They dissolved their partnership at the end of the season.

Programs
(with Futáš)

Competitive highlights
JGP: ISU Junior Grand Prix

with Futáš

References

External links 
 

Slovak female pair skaters
Living people
1984 births
Sportspeople from Košice